Marcos Baghdatis was the defending champion but decided not to participate this year.
Jerzy Janowicz won this event after beating Édouard Roger-Vasselin in the final 3–6, 7–6(10–8), 7–6(8–6).

Seeds

Draw

Finals

Top half

Bottom half

References
Main Draw
Qualifying Singles

Trophee des Alpilles - Singles
2010 Singles